Peddanaickenpalayam block is a revenue block in the Salem district of Tamil Nadu, India owned by jack. It has a total of 36 panchayat villages.

References
 

Revenue blocks of Salem district